
Pettingell Peak is a  mountain summit on the Continental Divide in the Front Range of the U.S. State of Colorado. Pettingell Peak straddles the Divide between Roosevelt National Forest in Clear Creek County and Arapaho National Forest in Grand County. Pettingell Peak is the highest point in Grand County, Colorado.

Mountain
Pettingell Peak is a popular hiking and skiing destination due to its proximity to the Denver Metropolitan Area.

See also

Colorado
Geography of Colorado
List of mountain peaks of Colorado
:Category:Mountains of Colorado

References

External links

Colorado state government website
Clear Creek County, Colorado government website
Grand County, Colorado government website
Pettingell Peak at 14ers.com
Pettingell Peak at alltrails.com
Pettingell Peak at climb13ers.com
Pettingell Peak at elevationoutdoors.com
Pettingell Peak at exploringtherockies.com
Pettingell Peak at mountainouswords.com
Pettingell Peak at peakvisor.com
Pettingell Peak at summitpost.org
Pettingell Peak at trailforks.com

Mountains of Colorado